The 1926–27 international cricket season was from September 1926 to April 1927. There were no Test matches held during this period.

Season overview

December

MCC in India

January

MCC in Ceylon

February

England in Jamaica

References

International cricket competitions by season
1926 in cricket
1927 in cricket